RDAP may refer to:

 Residential Drug Abuse Program
 Registration Data Access Protocol